Kampong Phluk is a commune in Prasat Bakong District in Siem Reap Province Cambodia. The name means "Harbor of the Tusks". The community largely depends on fishing for survival, primarily shrimp, spending Cambodia's wet season (May-October) fishing.

Many houses and buildings are constructed on stilts ranging from 6 m to 9 m to accommodate the changes in water level between wet and dry seasons.

During the dry season (November-April) as the river thins due to receding water, many turn to farming to supplement their income. Tourism, which started in the village approximately 10 years ago, is also a growing part of the local economy.

As of 2019, the commune has 911 families with a total population of 3,707. The commune consist of three villages: Tnaot Kambot, Dey Krahom, and Kok Kdol.

Gallery

References

External Links

Populated places in Siem Reap province
Communes of Siem Reap Province